Pioneer Days is the historical name of an annual community event in Chico, California celebrated the week prior to Pioneer Day, the first Saturday in May. Chico has a history of "May Day Parades" dating back to the late 19th century.

In 1915, the first parade that would later come to be called the Pioneer Day Parade was held on the downtown streets of Chico as a celebration of Chico Normal School's Senior Day. This tradition would continue as a celebration of local heritage under various names including Rancho Chico Days, and Celebration of People.

In 1987 Playboy Magazine named Chico State the "Number One Party School" in the nation. University President Robin Wilson met with city officials including City Manager Fred Davis, and Police Chief, John Bullerjahn with the goal of transforming the reputation by ending the parties directly with police intervention.  On 25 April 1987 riots broke out during the Pioneer Days celebration. President Wilson later announced an end to the 70-year-old tradition.

The tradition was revived two years later as Rancho Chico Days, and again in 1996 as the Celebration of People. The name Pioneer Days was brought back and has continued to now. One exception was 2020, when it was scrapped caused by the COVID-19 pandemic.

External links
Pioneer Day Parade
History of Pioneer Days
Photos of Pioneer Days

References

Festivals in California
California culture
Chico, California
Tourist attractions in Butte County, California
Tourist attractions in Chico, California
Holidays and observances by scheduling (nth weekday of the month)
May observances